Stephan Thomas Lappas (born March 18, 1954) is an American former  college basketball coach. He coached at Manhattan (1988–1992), Villanova (1992–2001) and UMass (2001–2005), compiling a 280–237 (.542) record over a 17-year coaching career.  He is currently a basketball color commentator and studio analyst for CBS Sports Network.

Biography

Education
Lappas graduated from Bronx High School of Science in 1972, where he was sixth man on its 1971 city championship team and a starter as a prep senior. He went on to the City College of New York, where he was a three-year letterwinner in basketball and served as the team's captain in his junior season. He graduated in 1977 with a bachelor's degree in primary education.

Coaching career
In 1977, Lappas started coaching at York College, City University of New York as a volunteer, and moved to Fort Lee High School the next year, becoming an assistant. After one season, he assumed his first head coaching job with Harry S. Truman High School (in The Bronx), staying there through 1984. Lappas fashioned a 91–32 record, and was named New York Daily News Coach of the Year twice (1981 and 1984). Harry S. Truman High School won a New York State Class A championship under Lappas in the 1983–84 season, during which it was 27–3. In 1984 Lappas joined Rollie Massimino's staff at Villanova University.

Head coach
In 1988 Lappas became head coach at Manhattan College, where he turned around the program from a 7–21 season in 1988–89 to a 25–9 season and a berth to the 3rd round of the NIT in 1992. In 1992, he succeeded Rollie Massimino as head coach at Villanova, where he guided the team to seven postseason tournament appearances (four NCAA, three NIT), posting an 8–6 record and winning the 1994 National Invitation Tournament. In 2001, he resigned as head coach after Villanova declined to sign him for a long-term contract due to multiple years of poor recruiting, and a subsequent lack of success in the postseason. He became head coach of the University of Massachusetts on March 26, 2001. In four seasons at UMass, the Minutemen struggled under Lappas, and finished with a record of 50–65.  His contract was not renewed and he was let go on March 14, 2005.

Head coaching record

College

* A-10 record includes a forfeit victory vs. St. Bonaventure, but season's overall win total does not include it.

References

1954 births
Living people
American men's basketball coaches
American men's basketball players
Basketball coaches from New York (state)
Basketball players from New York City
The Bronx High School of Science alumni
CCNY Beavers men's basketball players
College basketball announcers in the United States
College men's basketball head coaches in the United States
High school basketball coaches in the United States
Manhattan Jaspers basketball coaches
UMass Minutemen basketball coaches
Villanova Wildcats men's basketball coaches